The 2017 Campeonato Brasileiro de Marcas season will be the seventh season of the Brasileiro de Marcas.

Teams and drivers
{|
|

After six seasons and eleven titles (titles between brands, teams and drivers), Honda announces its departure in the Copa Petrobrás de Marcas in 2017

Race calendar and results
The 2017 schedule was announced on 22 December 2016.

Championship standings
Points system
Points are awarded for each race at an event to the driver/s of a car that completed at least 75% of the race distance and was running at the completion of the race.

Race: Used for the first and second race, with partially reversed (top eight) of each event.
Final round: Used for the final round of the season with double points.

Drivers' Championship

References

External links
  

Marcas
Brasileiro de Marcas seasons